The 1964 United States Senate election in Oklahoma took place on November 3, 1964. Democratic Senator Robert S. Kerr, who won re-election to his third term in 1960, died in office on January 1, 1963. Governor J. Howard Edmondson resigned from office so that his Lieutenant Governor, George Nigh, could appoint him to the U.S. Senate. Edmondson ran for re-election in the ensuing special election, and faced strong competition from former Governor Raymond D. Gary and State Senator Fred R. Harris. Edmondson placed first in the primary, but failed to win a majority, with Harris narrowly beating out Gary for second place. In the runoff, Harris defeated Edmondson in a landslide. In the general election, Harris faced former Oklahoma Sooners football coach Bud Wilkinson, the Republican nominee. Even though President Lyndon B. Johnson won Oklahoma by a wide margin over Republican presidential nominee Barry Goldwater, the Senate race was much closer. Ultimately, Harris only narrowly defeated Wilkinson by just 2% of the vote.

Democratic primary

Candidates
 J. Howard Edmondson, incumbent U.S. Senator, former Governor of Oklahoma
 Fred R. Harris, State Senator
 Raymond D. Gary, former Governor of Oklahoma

Results

Runoff election results

Republican primary

Candidates
 Bud Wilkinson, former Oklahoma Sooners football coach
 Thomas J. Harris, Oklahoma City businessman
 Forest W. Beall, former Chairman of the Oklahoma Republican PRunoff election arty

Results

General election

Results

References

1964
Oklahoma
United States Senate
Oklahoma 1964
Oklahoma 1964
United States Senate 1964